Makhlouf "Miki" Zohar (born 28 March 1980) is an Israeli politician. He currently serves as the Minister of Culture and Sports in the thirty-seventh government. Zohar previously served as a member of the Knesset for Likud and chairman of Global Likud.

Biography
Makhlouf Zohar was born in Beersheba, and raised in Kiryat Gat. His father Eli was an immigrant from Morocco and his mother Dina was from Tunisia. Zohar served in the Israel Defense Forces and reached the rank of Sergeant. He then studied law, gaining an LLB from the College of Law and Business and an MA from Bar-Ilan University, and worked in real estate.
Zohar is married to Yamit  and has four children.

Political career
In 2005 Zohar was elected to Kiryat Gat City Council. In 2013, he was elected head of Kiryat Gat's Likud list in 2013, and became Deputy Mayor. Prior to the 2015 Knesset elections he was placed twenty-second on the Likud list, a slot reserved for a candidate from the Negev area. He was elected to the Knesset as Likud won 30 seats. He was re-elected in April 2019 after being placed twenty-sixth on the party's list. He was re-elected in subsequent elections in September 2019 and March 2020, serving as Deputy Speaker of the Knesset and coalition whip from May 2020 to April 2021. After being re-elected in March 2021, he chaired the Arrangements Committee from April to May 2021.

On 29 December 2022, Zohar became the Minister of Culture and Sport. He resigned from the Knesset on 6 January 2023 as part of the Norwegian Law.

Views and opinions
Zohar is an advocate for observing Shabbat. He filed a bill that would outlaw forcing business owners to work on Saturdays. In addition, business owners would be able to file a claim for damages against members who violate Shabbat that harm them financially. Zohar stated in a radio interview for an ultra-Orthodox Jewish station that "Anyone who doesn't believe in God is delusional".

Zohar supported the creation of a new Israeli national holiday, Yom HaAliyah (Aliyah Day) to be celebrated annually on the tenth of the Hebrew month of Nisan. On 21 June 2016, the Knesset voted in favor of adding Yom HaAliyah to the national calendar. The Yom HaAliyah bill was co-sponsored by Knesset members from different parties in a rare instance of cooperation across the political spectrum. The day chosen for Yom HaAliyah is, according to the biblical narrative, the day Joshua and the Israelites crossed the Jordan River at Gilgal into the Promised Land. It was thus the first documented "mass Aliyah".

In June 2018, he stated in a radio debate that "the entire Jewish race is the highest human capital, the smartest, the most comprehending".

In November 2018, Zohar presented a bill in favor of replacing live animal shipments with chilled meat imports, after reports exposing widespread animal cruelty and health issues connected with live shipments.

During the Covid-19 pandemic Zohar was heavily criticized for his actions and words against the finance minister Israel Katz, Yifat Shasha Biton, head of the Covid-19 Knesset committee and Prof. Ronni Gamzu, the Corona Czar appointed by Netanyahu himself. He was also criticized with accusations of nepotism and favoritism when advocating for private weddings and gatherings to be held, while his family members own these types of establishments.

References

External links

1980 births
Living people
21st-century Israeli lawyers
Bar-Ilan University alumni
Basketball executives
Deputy mayors of places in Israel
Israeli people of Moroccan-Jewish descent
Israeli people of Tunisian-Jewish descent
Israeli sports executives and administrators
Jewish Israeli politicians
Likud politicians
Members of the 20th Knesset (2015–2019)
Members of the 21st Knesset (2019)
Members of the 22nd Knesset (2019–2020)
Members of the 23rd Knesset (2020–2021)
Members of the 24th Knesset (2021–2022)
Members of the 25th Knesset (2022–)
Politicians from Beersheba
People from Kiryat Gat
Ministers of Culture of Israel